Bard Island may refer to:
Barr'd Islands, Newfoundland and Labrador, in Canada
Bard Island (Lake Urmia), in Iran